Megachile sumatrana is a species of bee in the family Megachilidae. It was described by Friese in 1918.

References

Sumatrana
Insects described in 1918